Apterotoxitiades is a genus of the Dorcasominae subfamily in long-horned beetle family.

Species
BioLib lists:
 Apterotoxitiades aspinosus Björnstad, 2015
 Apterotoxitiades vivesi Adlbauer, 2008 from South Africa.

References

Dorcasominae
Beetles described in 2008